Barkakana Junction railway station, (station code BRKA), serves Barkakana and the surrounding coal mining areas in Ramgarh district in the Indian state of Jharkhand.

History
In 1927,  the Central India Coalfields Railway opened the Gomoh–Barkakana line. It was extended to Daltonganj in 1929. Later, these lines were amalgamated with East Indian Railway. In the same year (1927), Bengal Nagpur Railway opened the  Muri–Barkakana section to traffic. The 57 km-long Hazaribagh–Barkakana section was opened for passenger trains on 7 December 2016 by Railway Minister Suresh Prabhu in the presence of Chief Minister Raghubar Das

Electrification 
Barkakana–Garhwa, Barkakana–Danea and Barkakana–Ramgarh sections were electrified in 1996–97.

References

External links

Dhanbad railway division
Ramgarh district
Railway stations in Ramgarh district
Railway stations opened in 1927